The Battle of Castillejos was a battle fought on New Year's Day, 1860, between the Spanish Army of Africa under Leopoldo O'Donnell and the Moroccan Army under Mawlay Abbas in Fnideq (Castillejos) as the Spanish army attempted to capture the cities of Tétouan and Tangier. The Spanish were victorious.

References

Cervantes Virtual, Diario de un testigo de la guerra de África (1860) por Pedro Antonio de Alarcón, que actuó como precursor de lo que hoy llamamos corresponsal de guerra y describe con realismo la batalla de Los Castillejos.
Guillermo G. Calleja Leal https://web.archive.org/web/20080410063717/http://www.ejercito.mde.es/ihycm/revista/90/4calleja.htm
César Alcalá, La campaña de Marruecos, 1859–1860.

Conflicts in 1860
Battles involving Spain
Battles involving Morocco
19th century in Morocco
1860 in Morocco
Hispano-Moroccan War (1859–60)